Jean Jacques Joseph d'Alt (Fribourg, 27 July 1653 — Lugano 9 October 1714) was a Swiss officer and administrator.

Biography 
Alt was born to Tobie-Protais and Elisabeth de Diesbach, in an important patrician family. He rose in rank among the local administration, culminating as Bailiff of Gruyère between 1685 and 1690, and of Lugano between 1712 and 1714.

D'Alt was captain to the King of France in the Pfyffer regiment between 1674 and 1678 during the Franco-Dutch War, and colonel of a Swiss regiment fighting for Savoy at the beginning of the War of the Spanish Succession, for which he was awarded the Order of Sts. Maurice and Lazarus.

D'Alt was made a baron by Leopold I in 1704.

External links 
 The Fribourg Archive Project d'Alt
 The Fribourg Archive Project
 

1653 births
1714 deaths
17th-century Swiss people